César Mervin Marcano Sánchez (born October 22, 1987 in Carabobo) is a male professional track and road cyclist from Venezuela. He won a silver medal for his native country at the 2007 Pan American Games in Rio de Janeiro, Brazil, alongside Hersony Canelón and Andris Hernández in the Men's Track Team Sprint.

Career

2007
  in Pan American Games, Track, Team Sprint, Rio de Janeiro (BRA)
2010
 in Central American and Caribbean Games, Track, Team Sprint, Mayagüez (PUR)
 in Pan American Road and Track Championships, Track, Team Sprint, Aguascalientes (MEX)
2011
 in Round 2 2011–12 UCI Track Cycling World Cup, Team Sprint, Cali (COL)
 in Venezuelan National Championships, Track, Keirin
 in Venezuelan National Championships, Track, Sprint
2012
 in Venezuelan National Championships, Track, Keirin
 in Venezuelan National Championships, Track, Sprint
 in Venezuelan National Championships, Track, Team Sprint
 in Pan American Road and Track Championships, Track, Team Sprint
 in Round 1 2012–13 UCI Track Cycling World Cup, Team Sprint, Cali (COL)
2013
 in Pan American Road and Track Championships, Track, Team Sprint, Mexico City (MEX)
 in Venezuelan National Championships, Track, Sprint
 in Venezuelan National Championships, Track, Team Sprint
 in Venezuelan National Championships, Track, Keirin

References
 

1987 births
Living people
People from Carabobo
Venezuelan male cyclists
Venezuelan track cyclists
Cyclists at the 2007 Pan American Games
Cyclists at the 2011 Pan American Games
Cyclists at the 2012 Summer Olympics
Cyclists at the 2015 Pan American Games
Cyclists at the 2016 Summer Olympics
Cyclists at the 2019 Pan American Games
Olympic cyclists of Venezuela
Pan American Games gold medalists for Venezuela
Pan American Games silver medalists for Venezuela
Pan American Games medalists in cycling
Central American and Caribbean Games gold medalists for Venezuela
Central American and Caribbean Games bronze medalists for Venezuela
Competitors at the 2006 Central American and Caribbean Games
Competitors at the 2010 Central American and Caribbean Games
Central American and Caribbean Games medalists in cycling
Medalists at the 2007 Pan American Games
Medalists at the 2011 Pan American Games
Medalists at the 2015 Pan American Games
21st-century Venezuelan people
Competitors at the 2014 Central American and Caribbean Games
Competitors at the 2018 Central American and Caribbean Games